Shamsa Kanwal is a Pakistani radio, television, and film singer. She started singing as a child in the TV program "Geet Suhanay". She has sung around 1000 geets, ghazals, and playback songs during the 1980s and 1990s. She is also a poet and her first poetry book has been published under the title "Dhoop Ki Zad Mein Pehla Chand".

She was married to film director Altaf Hussain.

Songography
 Tu Aaya Aaya Hai
 Maan Bhi Jao
 Muskurane Ko Ji
 Ae Ri Gajarya
 Main Ne Tere Khawab
 Subah Ki Pehli Kiran
 Mat Jao Mat Jao
 Khuda Kare Ke Meri Arz-e-Pak
 Aesi Ratein Bhi
 Ranj Khenchey They Dagh
 Chup Ho Ja Re
 Aankhon Mein Tere Sapne
 Tujh Pe Fida Mere

Awards

References

Living people
Pakistani playback singers
Pakistani women singers
Pakistani television people
Year of birth missing (living people)